Haraldur Freyr Guðmundsson (born 14 December 1981) is an Icelandic retired professional footballer who played as a defender. During his career, Guðmundsson played in Norway for Aalesunds FK and Start; in Cyprus for Apollon Limassol; and had three separate spells with his 
hometown team Keflavík. He is now manager at Reynir Sandgerði and won the 4 Division 2018 with the club, without losing a single game, In 2020 he promoted Reynir to the 2 division. Two promotions in three years.

Club career
He has played for Cypriot team Apollon Limassol. He joined from Norwegian team Aalesunds FK having played there since 2005, when he joined from Icelandic team Keflavík. On 31 August 2011, he signed with Start. However, he switched back to Keflavík before the 2012 season. Played through Keflavík youth academy and then joining the first team in 1999.

Guðmundsson retired from football at the end of the 2016 season.

International career
He has also played for the Iceland national under-21 football team and twice for the Iceland senior side.

References

External links

1981 births
Living people
Haraldur Freyr Gudmundsson
Association football defenders
Haraldur Freyr Gudmundsson
Haraldur Freyr Gudmundsson
Haraldur Freyr Gudmundsson
Haraldur Freyr Gudmundsson
Haraldur Freyr Gudmundsson
Haraldur Freyr Gudmundsson
Haraldur Freyr Gudmundsson
Aalesunds FK players
Apollon Limassol FC players
Expatriate footballers in Norway
Expatriate footballers in Cyprus
Eliteserien players
Cypriot First Division players